Chittaranjan Locomotive Works (CLW) is an electric locomotive manufacturer based in India. The works are located at Chittaranjan in the Asansol Sadar subdivision of West Bengal, with an ancillary unit in Dankuni. The main unit is 32 km from Asansol and 237 km from Kolkata. CLW has stores and offices in Kolkata, as well as inspection cells in New Delhi, Mumbai, Kolkata, and Bangalore. It is the largest locomotive manufacturer unit in the world, producing 431 locomotives in 2019–20.

History

In the late 1930s, a committee consisting of M/s Humphries and Shrinivasan was created to consider the economic possibilities of establishing locomotive manufacturing facilities in India. The initial project at Chandmari, east of Kalyani in West Bengal, was found to be unsuitable due to the partition. A new survey led to the present site at Chittaranjan being established, which was approved by the railway board in 1947. A survey of the proposed area began on January 9, 1948; the rocky soil was an advantage in erecting structural foundations, and the undulating terrain solved the problem of drainage for the township. The Damodar Valley Corporation envisioned hydro-electric and thermal power stations in the area, assuring adequate power availability for the project.

The project was launched as Loco Building Works in 1950 to produce 120 average-sized steam locomotives. It also had the capacity to manufacture 50 spare boilers. Production of steam locomotives commenced on January 26, 1950. The first President of India, Rajendra Prasad, dedicated the first steam locomotive to the nation on 1 November 1950, and on the same day, the Loco Building Works was renamed as Chittaranjan Locomotive Works after Deshbandhu Chittaranjan Das. The nearby Mihijam Station was also renamed as Chittaranjan.

Steel Foundry at Chittaranjan
The technical collaborators in the U.K. for setting up of a Steel Foundry at Chittaranjan to produce steel castings for railway track. The final Draft agreement has been drawn up and sent to Messrs. F. H. Lloyd & Co.. U.K., for acceptance. The production is expected to commence after the completion of
construction and installation work which is estimated to take a period of about three years from the date of the signing of the Agreement. The  estimated cost of this foundry is Rs. 2.8 crores, approximately.

The terms of the agreement are that we shall pay a sum of £1 lakh to the company with which we are collaborating, they will be responsible for supplying all the designs, supervision, advice in procurement of machinery etc.; if it is purchased in England, they will be responsible for the inspection of the machinery; also generally, they are to help us in putting up the foundry and also to train up the necessary personnel.  In the first instance, the installed capacity is going to be 6,000 tons for steel castings for locomotives, and about 1,000 tons for track, from for points and crossings, from austenitic steel castings, which are made of a very hard type of steel. It will be mainly producing heavy and medium size castings im our steam locomotives.  

In 1962-63, a steel foundry was set up to manufacture cast steel locomotive parts. Production of diesel-hydraulic locomotives began in 1968. After manufacturing 2351 steam locomotives of 5 types and 842 diesel-hydraulic locomotives of 7 types, production of both of these classes was discontinued from 1950 to 1972 and 1968 to 1993, respectively.  Electric locomotive production commenced in 1961. The first Prime Minister of India, Pandit Jawaharlal Nehru, commissioned the first 1500 V DC Locomotive named Lokmanya on 14 October 1961. The production of 25 kV AC DC locomotives commenced on 16 November 1963, with the WAG-1 series, a broad-gauge 25 kV A.C. freight locomotive with 2840 hp and a maximum speed of 80 km/h. The first WAG-1 locomotive was named Bidhan.

CLW gradually began upgrading their locomotives to produce 6000 hp and achieve 160 km/h, and also started building the 25 kV AC/1500 V DC, AC/DC WCAM-1 series for hauling mail/express trains on the Western Railway. Additionally, production of DC traction motors and control equipment commenced in April 1967. CLW became the first manufacturer in India (as well as the second in Asia and fifth in the world) to manufacture a 3-phase GTO Thyristor-controlled electric locomotive. The first WAG-9 series locomotivethe first indigenous 6000 hp freight electric locomotivewas rolled out on 14 November 1988, and christened Navyug.10 May 2000 Navodit, the first passenger version of the WAP-5 series with a service speed of 160 km/h and the potential to reach 200 km/h, was manufactured; the project's highest-priority items are the development of material sourcing, indigenization, and cost reduction.

CLW has in-house facilities for machining and assembly of wheelsets, fabrication, bogies, etc. The facilities include modern CNC machines, plasma cutting machines, and inert gas welding sets. The factory obtains its iron and steel from Steel Authority of India, RINL and MDN, and sometimes from private steel plants like TATA, Jamshespur, and Jindal Steel. Hydroelectric power comes from Power Grid Corporation of India and the Damodar Valley Corporation's Maithon dam.

CLW's environment conservation efforts have been recognized by the World Environment Foundation, and was awarded the Golden Peacock Award for Environment Management 2006. CLW has fully complied with the provisions of the Industrial Safety Act, 1948 and was awarded the Safety Innovation Award in 2006 and 2009 by India's Institute of Engineers..

See also
 Banaras Locomotive Works, Varanasi
 Patiala Locomotive Works, Patiala
 Diesel Locomotive Factory, Marhowrah
 Electric Locomotive Factory, Madhepura
 Integral Coach Factory, Chennai
 Modern Coach Factory, Raebareli
 Rail Coach Factory, Kapurthala
 Rail Wheel Factory, Yelahanka
 Rail Wheel Plant, Bela
 Titagarh Wagons, Titagarh
 List of locomotive builders by countries

References

External links
 Chittaranjan Locomotive Works (CLW) Company website

 
Locomotive manufacturers of India
Buildings and structures in Paschim Bardhaman district
Economy of West Bengal
1950 establishments in West Bengal